Operation Daybreak (also known as The Price of Freedom in the U.S. and Seven Men at Daybreak during production) is a 1975 war film based on the true story of Operation Anthropoid, the assassination of SS general Reinhard Heydrich in Prague. Starring Anthony Andrews, Timothy Bottoms and Martin Shaw, the film was directed by Lewis Gilbert and shot mostly on location in Prague. It is adapted from the book Seven Men at Daybreak by Alan Burgess.

Plot
In late 1941, General František Moravec orders three British-trained Czech partisans, Jan Kubiš, Jozef Gabčík and Karel Čurda to participate in a military operation described as the most important of the war. Reinhard Heydrich is the brutal  Reich Protector in Prague and Moravec predicts that he could be Hitler's successor if the Fuhrer were to die. The men are parachuted into occupied Czechoslovakia and during descent, Gabčík is injured. The third man, Čurda, falls further away and the two realize they are not near the intended location. They encounter a couple of quarrymen who offer assistance in getting the men to medical aid by bribing a Feldwebel in a patrol car to take them to a doctor. The three men regroup at a local doctor, who offers medical assistance to Gabčík.

They continue to Prague, where they are offered a hiding place by the Moravec family. The first attempt to assassinate Heydrich on his departing train fails, being blocked by another passing train. A new plan is formulated, which involves shooting Heydrich as his car slows down at a bend in the road on his regular morning drive into the city from his residence in the country. As Heydrich approaches, Gabčík runs in front of his car to shoot, but the gun jams and he runs from the scene, chased by Heydrich's driver. Kubiš throws a grenade at the car, which explodes nearby and injures Heydrich, who is taken to hospital and dies shortly after.

Čurda, who has a wife and child living nearby whom he visits frequently, fears for their lives and turns himself in to the Gestapo, betraying the assassins and those who hid them. With this intelligence, the Moravec family are arrested. When the Germans learn the paratroopers are hiding in the Saints Cyril and Methodius Cathedral, a long battle ensues in an attempt to draw them out, first by gassing then by flooding. The assassins, knowing they cannot escape alive and unwilling to surrender, fatally shoot each other in the flooded crypt.

Cast

Production

Development
The screen rights to the novel Seven Men at Daybreak by Alan Burgess were acquired by Warner Bros in mid-1973. Filming on the wartime-action movie based on the book, itself based on a factual story, was announced to be starting in November 1974 with screenplay by Ronald Harwood, and based on the factual events of the assassination of Reinhard Heydrich. The film was produced by Carter Dehaven and directed by Lewis Gilbert.

Casting
In November 1974, Timothy Bottoms signed to star in the film. To prepare for the role of Kubiš, leader of the group and eventual hero who does the killing, Bottoms spent three months on location in Czechoslovakia. The castings of Anthony Andrews, Martin Shaw and Nicola Pagett were announced in December 1974, who all had acting experience from London's West End theatre.

Anton Diffring was cast as Heydrich and was familiar to viewers due to being frequently cast as Nazi officers in war films of the 1950s and 1960s. Diffring, being born in 1918, was in his mid-50s when he took on the role, despite Heydrich being 38 when he died.

In January 1975, Gilbert announced that the actor chosen to play Adolf Hitler had to be replaced, as the original actor turned out to be too small for the role. Calls were made to Gunnar Möller and George Sewell, the latter of who went on to play Heinz Pannwitz.

The size of the cast was around 3,000 which also included actors of German, French, Finnish and Czech origin.

Filming
The film was entirely American produced and financed and was shot on location in Prague, Czechoslovakia, using various places that were part of the real assassination. Scenes outside of Prague were filmed in the town of Karlovy Vary. During filming, cast and crew were accommodated in Prague's Alcron Hotel, with little opportunity to explore the city. Bottoms was accompanied with his wife Alicia, who described the local population as "very guarded" and unprepared to handle tourists. They struggled to find accommodation, eventually settling on a tiny apartment that they rented for $1,000 a week.

The Swastika flag was hung around Prague and in particular at Prague railway station. Younger extras on set, who had no experience of the war, showed little emotion. In one instance, an elderly woman arriving from the countryside needed reassurance from railway station workers that the German invaders had not returned, while another Czech woman was observed to glance disapprovingly at an actor wearing a full Nazi SS uniform.

For the razing of Lidice, the movie deployed convincing replica Tiger tanks, built on the T-34 chassis. Historic film footage from the destruction is inter-cut with new film footage shot by Gilbert.

Music 
The credits show that the music was played on an ARP synthesizer by David Hentschel.

Critical reception
Colin Bennett of Australia's The Age newspaper felt that while the latter part of the film was "very moving", this only made up for the "quiet drabness" that was shown before. He did believe that the film felt authentic and felt the acting was mostly understated, suggesting that British actors Andrews and Shaw eclipsed Bottoms, who was promoted as the star of the show. Film critic Tony Sloman described the film as a "grimly exciting war drama", describing Andrews as "excellent" in his role as a fellow Czech patriot. Writing for The Baltimore Sun, R. H. Gardner was critical of the film's omission of historical context and felt the film lacked "the punch a chronicle of such a tragic and heroic event should have".

Historical inaccuracies
While the film remains true to the facts of the operation, critics have highlighted some inaccuracies and omissions. The circumstances leading up to the assassination of Heydrich were largely ignored, with the implication that the operation was primarily an effort to remove a man who may have been the successor to Adolf Hitler, yet Heydrich was not considered second to Hitler within the Nazi party. While the film portrays the British Special Operations Executive as being responsible for the operation, in reality they had little involvement, as it was primarily the Czechoslovak government-in-exile that organised the operation. The operation was considered a necessity by Winston Churchill in an effort to raise allied morale, despite the expectation of German retribution. The film failed to emphasize this facet or the involvement of those whose actions ultimately resulted in the Nazi destruction of Lidice.

The film does not show that aunt Marie Moravcová commits suicide in the toilet after consuming a capsule of cyanide. Similarly, Ata was not interrogated in the flat as the film suggests, but was arrested along with his father. After his mother's suicide, he was shown her severed head and warned his father would be killed if he did not reveal information. This is not shown in the film.

In the film, Sergeant Karel Curda's betrayal made him appear as a "treacherous weakling", though in reality his confession came after an order by Hitler for the execution of 30,000 political Czech prisoners of war.

The finale shows Kubiš and Gabčík sacrificing each other in a flooded crypt, yet in reality, Kubiš was found unconscious in the church by the Nazis and taken to hospital upon where he was declared dead within twenty minutes. Other reports from the time suggested that the Gestapo claimed the paratroopers were captured while hiding and were immediately executed.

See also
 Dramatic portrayals of Reinhard Heydrich

References
Citations

Sources

External links
 
 Operation Daybreak at the TCM Movie Database
 
 
 

1975 films
1975 war films
Films directed by Lewis Gilbert
Films about Operation Anthropoid
Warner Bros. films
Films shot in the Czech Republic
Czech war films
American war drama films
English-language Czech films
Films with screenplays by Ronald Harwood
Czech World War II films
American World War II films
Czechoslovak World War II films
1970s American films